6park is a Chinese Internet forum specializing in news written in Mandarin Chinese, launched in 2003. Its Chinese name means a place which made people are reluctant to leave. It is a "mega-BBS" with forums for subjects as diverse as economics, health, marriage, and online movies, etc., but its style is unique and unrelated to other mega-BBSes such as 2channel. Meanwhile, it is worth noticing that 6park is becoming one of the most important Internet platforms for overseas Chinese people.

It collects news from all different parties and not just about critical of the Chinese government. It has a large community of overseas Chinese students and expatriates from around the world, especially people from North America. Moreover, this website is the first Chinese network which is managed by the users themselves.

It has been mentioned in news sources such as Hua Sheng Online as a way for Chinese people living overseas to get news. The website provides news from China, as well as translating news from foreign media (such as newspaper, television and websites).

References

External links
  

Internet forums
Chinese news websites